Puzzle Collection may refer to:
Microsoft Entertainment Pack: The Puzzle Collection, a collection of puzzle computer games
Nintendo Puzzle Collection, a collection of puzzle video games by Nintendo for the Nintendo GameCube home console
Pokémon Puzzle Collection, a puzzle minigames collection for the Pokémon mini handheld game console
Puzzle Series, a video game brand by Hudson Soft